"Stranger than Fiction" is a song by British singer-songwriter and musician Joe Jackson, which was released in 1991 as the lead single from his ninth studio album Laughter & Lust. It was written by Jackson, and produced by Jackson and Ed Roynesdal. "Stranger than Fiction" reached No. 53 in Germany, No. 71 in the Netherlands, and No. 79 on Canada's RPM 100 Singles chart. A music video was filmed to promote the single.

Critical reception
On its release, Alan Jones of Music Week commented, "Lighter than his latter work, 'Stranger than Fiction' is oddly reminiscent of the Hollies. Probably not a hit, but a mouthwatering taster for Jackson's forthcoming album." Music & Media wrote, "His first Virgin release and what a smash song too! Jackson has returned to pop. The chorus will be whistled from every grocery shop to every petrol station all over Europe."

Barbara Ellen of New Musical Express described the song as "not bad" but added that "yet another whirl around low-rent suburbia is not quite what the 'kids' are into at the moment". Jon Wilde of Melody Maker was critical, calling it "sub-Costello gripe". Andrew Hirst of the Huddersfield Daily Examiner felt the song "lacks the tuneful sting to scratch too deep beneath its cheerfully witty veneer".

In a review of Laughter & Lust, Billboard described the song as "Rundgren-esque". Tom Long of the Santa Cruz Sentinel felt the song "harkens back" to Jackson's 1979 hit "Is She Really Going Out with Him?" in terms of "sheer listenability". John Everson of the Southtown Star considered it "a sweet ballad with a sleek '60s-ish organ solo that just begs to be played on pop radio". Dan Bennett of the North County Blade-Citizen wrote, "Jackson's wisecracking but still vulnerable take on love and folly is indeed the ultimate single."

Track listing
7" single
"Stranger than Fiction" - 3:40
"Drowning" - 5:09

12" single
"Stranger than Fiction" - 3:40
"Different For Girls (New Recording)" - 3:37
"Drowning" - 5:09

Cassette single (US release)
"Stranger than Fiction" - 3:40
"Jenny Jenny" - 2:44

CD single (UK release)
"Stranger than Fiction" - 3:40
"Different For Girls (New Recording)" - 3:37
"Drowning" - 5:09

CD single (US promo)
"Stranger than Fiction" - 3:40

CD single (Japanese promo)
"Stranger than Fiction" - 3:44
"Drowning" - 5:10

Personnel
 Joe Jackson - vocals, keyboards
 Tom Teeley - guitar
 Joy Askew - keyboards, backing vocals
 Graham Maby - bass
 Dan Hickey - drums
 Sue Hadjopoulos - drums, percussion

Production
 Joe Jackson - producer (all tracks)
 Ed Roynesdal - producer on "Stranger than Fiction" and "Drowning"
 Larry Alexander - engineer
 Bob Ludwig - mastering

Other
 Calef Brown - illustration
 Patrik Andersson - photography

Charts

References

1991 songs
1991 singles
Songs written by Joe Jackson (musician)
Joe Jackson (musician) songs
Virgin Records singles